Lout may refer to:

 Lout (EP), a 2021 EP by The Horrors
 Lout (software), a batch document formatter
 Lout Pond, in Plymouth, Massachusetts, United States
 Louts, a tributary of the river Adour in France

See also 
 Laut (disambiguation)